Asannagar Madan Mohan Tarkalankar College, (Bengali: আসাননগর মদনমোহন তর্কালঙ্কার কলেজ), is a general degree college at Asannagar village in Nadia district, in the state of West Bengal, India. It offers undergraduate courses in arts. It is affiliated to  University of Kalyani.

History 
The college was established in 2007 in memory of an outstanding scholar and  Bengali Pandit Madan Mohan Tarkalankar with the approval of the W.B.C.H.E. Initially the college started its journey with pass course in Humanities. Afterwards honours course in Bengali and History were promulgated. In the year 2009 honours courses in English and Sanskrit were introduced and in pass course Education and Philosophy were also started.

Departments

Arts

Bengali(Hons)
English(Hons)
History(Hons)
Political Science
Philosophy
Education
Physical Education
Economics
Sanskrit (Hons)

Accreditation
In 2016 the college has been awarded 'B' grade by the National Assessment and Accreditation Council (NAAC). The college is recognized by the University Grants Commission (UGC).

See also

References

External links
Asannagar Madan Mohan Tarkalankar College
University of Kalyani
University Grants Commission
National Assessment and Accreditation Council

Universities and colleges in Nadia district
Colleges affiliated to University of Kalyani
Educational institutions established in 2007
2007 establishments in West Bengal